Ole Bakke (1889–1925) was a Norwegian-American architect practicing in Missoula, a city in western Montana.

Bakke, a native of Norway, arrived in Missoula in 1900. As a teenager, he worked as a draftsman for A. J. Gibson, the region's leading architect. Upon Gibson's retirement in 1913, Bakke succeeded to the business. However, Gibson continued to practice in a consulting position, and is thus credited with the design of the First Presbyterian Church, of which he was an active member. Bakke practiced until his departure for Norway circa 1922. His office, in turn, was succeeded by H. E. Kirkemo, who had joined Bakke as a draftsman in 1920. Bakke returned to Missoula in 1924, and died there in 1925.

In his time, Bakke was outside of the American architectural mainstream. Many of his major works were designed in the Arts and Crafts style, embraced in England, but largely ignored in the United States. He designed a number of schools in this manner, including the Lincoln School in Missoula and the Alberton School in Alberton. He also embraced the Mission Revival, which appears in the school at Dixon (published in 1921) and the Franklin School in Missoula.

Before World War I, his few works in the mainstream were built primarily in cases where Bakke was under Gibson's influence, such as his addition to the Carnegie Public Library and the flanking wings of the Missoula County High School, both originally designed by Gibson. After the war, he turned away from his more innovative work, and to the standard revival styles of the day, resulting in the Classically-derived (though still within the Chicago School) Smead-Simons Building and the Italian Renaissance Revival Forestry Building at the University.

Architectural works
 1913 - Carnegie Public Library (Addition), 335 N Pattee St, Missoula, Montana
 1913 - First Presbyterian Church, 235 S 5th St W, Missoula, Montana
 Architect of record for A. J. Gibson
 1914 - Lincoln School, 1209 Lolo St, Missoula, Montana
 1914 - Agricultural (Commercial) Building, Missoula County Fairgrounds, Missoula, Montana
 1916 - Franklin School, 1901 S 10th St W, Missoula, Montana
 1917 - Missoula County High School (Addition), 900 S Higgins Ave, Missoula, Montana
 1918 - Alberton School, 306 Railroad Ave, Alberton, Montana
 1919 - Browning School, 112 1st Ave SE, Browning, Montana
 1919 - Dixon School, 411 B St, Dixon, Montana
 1920 - Missoula County High School (Addition), 900 S Higgins Ave, Missoula, Montana
 1920 - Smead-Simons Building, 104 S Higgins Ave, Missoula, Montana
 1921 - Forestry Building, University of Montana, Missoula, Montana
 1921 - University Congregational Church, 405 University Ave, Missoula, Montana
 1922 - Heating Plant, University of Montana, Missoula, Montana
 In association with Clarence J. Forbis

References

1889 births
1925 deaths
20th-century American architects
Norwegian emigrants to the United States
Architects from Montana
Artists from Missoula, Montana
Chicago school architects
Arts and Crafts movement artists